Bob French may refer to:
Bob French (jazz musician) (c. 1938–2012), American jazz drummer and radio show host
Bob French (bluegrass musician)
Bob French (politician) (1944–2002), businessman and politician in Newfoundland and Labrador